Portrait Edition is a three disc box set compilation album released by Sony Entertainment and featuring songs recorded by American singer Jo Stafford. The album was released by Sony on August 30, 1994.

Track listing
Disc 1

1. Little Man With A Candy Cigar - (Matt Dennis; Frank Kilduff)

2. Haunted Heart - (Howard Dietz; Arthur Schwartz)

3. If - (Stanley Damerell; Tolchard Evans; Robert Hargreaves)

4. In A Little Spanish Town ('Twas On A Night Like This) - (Sam M. Lewis; Joe Young; Mabel Wayne)

5. April And You - (Al Frisch; Allan Roberts)

6. Where Are You? - (Gus Kahn; Al Rinker)

7. The Trolley Song - (Hugh Martin; Ralph Blaine)

8. I'll Remember April - (Gene DePaul; Don Raye; Patricia Johnston)

9. Blues In The Night - (Harold Arlen; Johnny Mercer)

10. Floatin' Down To Cotton Town - (F. Henri Klickmann; Manfred Weissleder)

11. Every Night When The Sun Goes In - (Traditional)

12. The Night We Called It A Day - (Matt Dennis; Tom Adair)

13. The Gentleman Is A Dope - (Richard Rodgers; Oscar Hammerstein II)

14. My Darling, My Darling - (Frank Loesser)

15. Young and Foolish - (Albert Hague; Arnold B. Horwitt)

16. Tomorrow Mountain - (Duke Ellington; John Latouche)

17. (There'll Be) Peace In The Valley (For Me) - (Thomas A. Dorsey)

18. Teardrops from My Eyes - (Rudy Toombs)

19. Dancing In The Dark - (Howard Dietz; Arthur Schwartz)

20. Love Is Here to Stay - (George Gershwin; Ira Gershwin)

21. The Gypsy in My Soul - (Clay Boland; Moe Jaffe)

22. Imagination - (Johnny Burke; James Van Heusen)

23. If I Were a Bell - (Frank Loesser)

24. No Other Love - (Bob Russell; Paul Weston)

25. You're Blasé - (Bruce Sievier; Ord Hamilton)

Disc 2

1. You And Your Love - (Johnny Green; Johnny Mercer)

2. As I Love You - (Ray Evans; Jay Livingston)

3. Teach Me Tonight - (Sammy Cahn; Gene DePaul)

4. When April Comes Again - (Doris Schaefer; Paul Weston)

5. St. Louis Blues - (W. C. Handy)

6. Good Nite - (Bert Bender / Dorothy Jeffers; Ethel Phillips)

7. Make The Man Love Me - (Dorothy Fields; Arthur Schwartz)

8. Warm All Over - (Frank Loesser)

9. The Best Things in Life Are Free - (Lew Brown; Buddy DeSylva; Ray Henderson)

10. One (Based On One Hand, One Heart) - (Leonard Bernstein; Stephen Sondheim)

11. These Foolish Things (Remind Me of You) - (Harry Link; Holt Marvell; Jack Strachey)

12. In the Cool, Cool, Cool of the Evening - (Hoagy Carmichael; Johnny Mercer)

13. The Nearness Of You - (Hoagy Carmichael; Ned Washington)

14. Smoking My Sad CIgarette - (Don George; Bee Walker)

15. The Party's Over - (Betty Comden; Adolph Green; Jule Styne)

16. The Folks Who Live On the Hill - (Oscar Hammerstein II; Jerome Kern)

17. A Thought In My Heart - (Robert F. Calder)

18. Yes, Indeed! - (Sy Oliver)

19. I'm Your Girl - (Oscar Hammerstein II; Richard Rodgers)

20. When I'm Not Near The Boy I Love - (E.Y. "Yip" Harburg; Burton Lane)

21. Whispering Hope - (Alice Hawthorne)

22. Shenandoah - (Traditional)

23. What Can I Say After I Say I'm Sorry? - (Walter Donaldson; Abe Lyman)

24. I'll Be Seeing You - (Sammy Fain; Irving Kahal)

25. Candy - (Mack David; Alex Kramer; Joan Whitney)

26. The Last Time I Saw Paris - (Oscar Hammerstein II; Jerome Kern)

Disc 3

1. All The Things You Are - (Oscar Hammerstein II; Jerome Kern)

2. If I Loved You - (Oscar Hammerstein II; Richard Rodgers)

3. What Is This Thing Called Love? - (Cole Porter)

4. Come Rain or Come Shine - (Harold Arlen; Johnny Mercer)

5. With These Hands - (Benny Davis; Abner Silver)

6. Use Your Imagination - (Cole Porter)

7. Three-Cornered Tune - (Frank Loesser)

8. It Happened In Sun Valley - (Mack Gordon; Harry Warren)

9. Don't Get Around Much Anymore - (Duke Ellington; Bob Russell)

10. Oh! Look at Me Now - (Joe Bushkin; John DeVries)

11. I Don't Stand a Ghost of a Chance with You - (Bing Crosby; Ned Washington; Victor Young)

12. My Heart's In The Highlands - (Robert Burns; Al Rinker)

13. My One And Only Highland Fling - (Ira Gershwin; Harry Warren)

14. I Didn't Know About You - (Duke Ellington; Bob Russell)

15. Indiscretion - (Sammy Cahn; Alessandro Cicognini; Paul Weston)

16. Old Devil Moon - (E.Y. "Yip" Harburg; Burton Lane)

17. For You - (Joe Burke; Al Dubin)

18. Silence Is Golden - (Jack Fulton; Lois Steele)

19. The King of Paris - (Marilyn Bergman; Paul Weston)

20. I Should Care - (Sammy Cahn; Axel Stordahl; Paul Weston)

21. Stardust - (Hoagy Carmichael; Mitchell Parish)

22. I See Your Face Before Me - (Howard Dietz; Arthur Schwartz)

23. You Belong to Me - (Pee Wee King; Chilton Price; Redd Stewart)

24. Stayin' Alive - (Barry Gibb; Maurice Gibb; Robin Gibb)

25. I Am Woman - (Ray Burton; Helen Reddy)

References

1994 compilation albums
Jo Stafford compilation albums
Sony Records compilation albums